The Subcommittee on Health is a subcommittee of the Committee on Ways and Means in the United States House of Representatives.

Jurisdiction
From the House rules
The jurisdiction of the Subcommittee on Health includes bills and matters referred to the Committee on Ways and Means that relate to programs providing payments (from any source) for health care, health delivery systems, or health research.  More specifically, the jurisdiction of the Subcommittee on Health includes bills and matters that relate to the health care programs of the Social Security Act (including titles V, XI (Part B), XVIII, and XIX thereof) and, concurrent with the full Committee, tax credit and deduction provisions of the Internal Revenue Code dealing with health insurance premiums and health care costs.

History
In 2014, the full committee voted to resist a subpoena from the Securities and Exchange Commission to look into insider trader allegations between subcommittee staff director Brian Sutter and Mark Hayes, a lobbyist at Greenberg Traurig.

Members, 117th Congress

Historical membership rosters

115th Congress

116th Congress

See also
 United States House Energy Subcommittee on Health

References

External links
 Ways and Means Committee Website: Subcommittee Page

Ways and Means Health